Gullfjellet or Gulfjellet is a  tall mountain in Vestland county, Norway. It is situated on the border between the municipalities of Bergen and Samnanger, and it is the highest mountain in the municipality of Bergen. The name "Gul" is an old name for a strong wind, so the old name - Gulfjellet - means "the mountain with strong wind".

Due to its importance as a hiking attraction, and much bad weather, large and numerous cairns have been put up ("Varderekka") to guide hikers from both sides of the mountain. The watercourses on Gullfjellet supports large parts of the Bergen region with piped water.

See also
List of mountains of Norway

References

Mountains of Bergen
Samnanger